Aulong (Jawi: اولوڠ) is a suburb of Taiping, Perak, Malaysia. This town has an estimated population of 5000, with the majority being Chinese and Malays. The main town centre consists of the old and new villages. There are a few housing estates in the area, including Taman Pertama and Taman Kami (Phase A to D). Together with Pokok Assam, Aulong is a "White village", which was created during the Malaya Emergency in the 1950s.

This town also has a mosque, an Indian Temple, a Chinese temple and a Catholic Chapel. A police station and a community hall too. Two factories of the cottage industry are located here - a toothpick factory and an ice-cream "potong" manufacturer. The main roads in this area include Jalan Izuddin Shah, Jalan Sultan, Jalan Permaisuri, Jalan Simpang Halt and Jalan Tekah in Kampung Boyan. There is a Shell petrol station in Giant Taiping. Petronas is also located beside Hua Lian (1) and (2) Primary schools.

References

 

Taiping, Perak
Towns in Perak